Pellilitorina is a genus of sea snails, marine gastropod mollusks in the family Littorinidae, the winkles or periwinkles.

Species
Species within the genus Pellilitorina include:

 Pellilitorina pellita (Martens, 1885)
 Pellilitorina setosa (E.A. Smith, 1875)

References

Littorinidae